Marchais is a commune in the Aisne department in Hauts-de-France in northern France. It takes its name from the Latin 'mercasius' or marshland.

The 16th century Chateau de Marchais is a private residence of the Princes of Monaco, since being acquired in 1854 by Charles III. It was built in the 16th century by Nicolas de Longueval, Comte de Bossut. He was accused of treason, though, and to save his life, he surrendered his castle and lands to Charles, Cardindal of Lorraine.

In 1906, Maurice Léger made a prototype helicopter flight at Marchais.

Population

See also
Communes of the Aisne department

References

Communes of Aisne